The 4th Golden Satellite Awards, given by the International Press Academy, were awarded on January 16, 2000.

Special achievement awards
Mary Pickford Award (for outstanding contribution to the entertainment industry) – Maximilian Schell

Outstanding Contribution to New Media – Artisan Entertainment (for the Blair Witch Project website)

Outstanding New Talent – Haley Joel Osment

Special Achievement Award (for a formidable strategist) – Dale Olson

Motion picture winners and nominees

Best Actor – Drama
 Terence Stamp – The Limey
Russell Crowe – The Insider
Richard Farnsworth – The Straight Story
Al Pacino – The Insider
Kevin Spacey – American Beauty
Denzel Washington – The Hurricane

Best Actor – Musical or Comedy
 Philip Seymour Hoffman – Flawless
Jim Carrey – Man on the Moon
Johnny Depp – Sleepy Hollow
Rupert Everett – An Ideal Husband
Sean Penn – Sweet and Lowdown
Steve Zahn – Happy, Texas

Best Actress – Drama
 Hilary Swank – Boys Don't Cry
Annette Bening – American Beauty
Elaine Cassidy – Felicia's Journey
Nicole Kidman – Eyes Wide Shut
Youki Kudoh – Snow Falling on Cedars
Sigourney Weaver – A Map of the World

Best Actress – Musical or Comedy
 Janet McTeer – Tumbleweeds
Julianne Moore – An Ideal Husband
Frances O'Connor – Mansfield Park
Julia Roberts – Notting Hill
Cecilia Roth – All About My Mother (Todo sobre mi madre)
Reese Witherspoon – Election

Best Animated or Mixed Media Film
 Toy Story 2
The Iron Giant
Princess Mononoke (Mononoke-hime)
South Park: Bigger Longer & Uncut
Stuart Little
Tarzan

Best Art Direction
 Sleepy Hollow – Ken Court, John Dexter, Rick Heinrichs, and Andy Nicholson
Anna and the King
An Ideal Husband
The Emperor and the Assassin (Jing ke ci qin wang)
The Legend of 1900 (La leggenda del pianista sull'oceano)
Titus

Best Cinematography
 Sleepy Hollow – Emmanuel Lubezki
American Beauty
Anna and the King
Eyes Wide Shut
Snow Falling on Cedars
The Talented Mr. Ripley

Best Costume Design
 Sleepy Hollow – Colleen Atwood
Anna and the King
The Emperor and the Assassin (Jing ke ci qin wang)
An Ideal Husband
The Red Violin (Le violon rouge)
Titus

Best Director
 Michael Mann – The Insider
Paul Thomas Anderson – Magnolia
Scott Hicks – Snow Falling on Cedars
Sam Mendes – American Beauty
Anthony Minghella – The Talented Mr. Ripley
Kimberly Peirce – Boys Don't Cry

Best Documentary Film
 Buena Vista Social Club
42: Forty Two Up
American Movie
Mr. Death: The Rise and Fall of Fred A. Leuchter, Jr.
Return with Honor
The Source

Best Editing
 The Sixth Sense – Andrew Mondshein
American Beauty
Buena Vista Social Club
The Insider
Sleepy Hollow
The Talented Mr. Ripley

Best Film – Drama
 The Insider
American Beauty
Boys Don't Cry
Magnolia
Snow Falling on Cedars
The Talented Mr. Ripley

Best Film – Musical or Comedy
 Being John Malkovich
Bowfinger
Dick
Election
An Ideal Husband
Notting Hill

Best Foreign Language Film
 All About My Mother (Todo sobre mi madre), France / Spain (TIE) 
 Three Seasons (Ba mua), USA / Vietnam (TIE)
The Emperor and the Assassin (Jing ke ci qin wang)
The King of Masks (Biàn Liǎn)
The Red Violin (Le violon rouge)
Run Lola Run (Lola rennt)

Best Original Score
 "Sleepy Hollow" – Danny Elfman
"The Legend of 1900 (La leggenda del pianista sull'oceano)" – Ennio Morricone
"Ravenous" – Damon Albarn and Michael Nyman
"The Red Violin (Le violon rouge)" – John Corigliano
"Snow Falling on Cedars" – James Newton Howard
"The Thomas Crown Affair" – Bill Conti

Best Original Song
 "When She Loved Me" performed by Sarah McLachlan – Toy Story 2
"Get Lost" – The Story of Us
"Mountain Town" – South Park: Bigger Longer & Uncut
"Save Me" – Magnolia
"Still" – Dogma
"The World Is Not Enough" – The World Is Not Enough

Best Screenplay – Adapted
 The Cider House Rules – John Irving
Felicia's Journey – Atom Egoyan
A Map of the World – Peter Hedges and Polly Platt
Onegin – Peter Ettedgui and Michael Ignatieff
The Talented Mr. Ripley – Anthony Minghella
Titus – Julie Taymor

Best Screenplay – Original
 The Sixth Sense – M. Night Shyamalan
American Beauty – Alan Ball
Being John Malkovich – Charlie Kaufman
Magnolia – Paul Thomas Anderson
Three Kings – David O. Russell and John Ridley
A Walk on the Moon – Pamela Gray

Best Sound
 Sleepy Hollow – Frank Morrone, Skip Lievsay, and Gary Alpers
Buena Vista Social Club
The Emperor and the Assassin (Jing ke ci qin wang)
Eyes Wide Shut
The Sixth Sense
Star Wars: Episode I – The Phantom Menace

Best Supporting Actor – Drama
 Harry J. Lennix – Titus
Michael Caine – The Cider House Rules
Tom Cruise – Magnolia
Doug Hutchison – The Green Mile
Jude Law – The Talented Mr. Ripley
Christopher Plummer – The Insider

Best Supporting Actor – Musical or Comedy
 William H. Macy – Happy, Texas
Dan Hedaya – Dick
Rhys Ifans – Notting Hill
Bill Murray – Cradle Will Rock
Ving Rhames – Bringing Out the Dead
Alan Rickman – Dogma

Best Supporting Actress – Drama
 Chloë Sevigny – Boys Don't Cry
Erykah Badu – The Cider House Rules
Toni Collette – The Sixth Sense
Jessica Lange – Titus
Sissy Spacek – The Straight Story
Charlize Theron – The Cider House Rules

Best Supporting Actress – Musical or Comedy
 Catherine Keener – Being John Malkovich
Cate Blanchett – An Ideal Husband
Cameron Diaz – Being John Malkovich
Samantha Morton – Sweet and Lowdown
Antonia San Juan – All About My Mother (Todo sobre mi madre)
Tori Spelling – Trick

Best Visual Effects
 Stuart Little
The Matrix
The Mummy
Sleepy Hollow
Star Wars: Episode I – The Phantom Menace
Titus

Outstanding Motion Picture Ensemble
Magnolia

Television winners and nominees

Best Actor – Drama Series
 Martin Sheen – The West Wing
James Gandolfini – The Sopranos
Dylan McDermott – The Practice
Eamonn Walker – Oz
Sam Waterston – Law & Order

Best Actor – Musical or Comedy Series
 Jay Mohr – Action
Ted Danson – Becker
Thomas Gibson – Dharma & Greg
Eric McCormack – Will & Grace
David Hyde Pierce – Frasier

Best Actor – Miniseries or TV Film
 William H. Macy – A Slight Case of Murder
Beau Bridges – P. T. Barnum
Don Cheadle – A Lesson Before Dying
Delroy Lindo – Strange Justice
Brent Spiner – Introducing Dorothy Dandridge

Best Actress – Drama Series
 Camryn Manheim – The Practice
Lorraine Bracco – The Sopranos
Edie Falco – The Sopranos
Mariska Hargitay – Law & Order: Special Victims Unit
Kelli Williams – The Practice

Best Actress – Musical or Comedy Series
 Illeana Douglas – Action
Jennifer Aniston – Friends
Jenna Elfman – Dharma & Greg
Calista Flockhart – Ally McBeal
Jane Leeves – Frasier

Best Actress – Miniseries or TV Film
 Linda Hamilton – The Color of Courage
Kathy Bates – Annie
Halle Berry – Introducing Dorothy Dandridge
Leelee Sobieski – Joan of Arc
Regina Taylor – Strange Justice

Best Miniseries
 Hornblower: The Even Chance
Bonanno: A Godfather's Story
Joan of Arc
P. T. Barnum
Purgatory

Best Series – Drama
 The West Wing
Law & Order
Oz
The Practice
The Sopranos

Best Series – Musical or Comedy
 Action
Becker
Dharma & Greg
Frasier
Sex and the City

Best TV Film
 Strange Justice
Introducing Dorothy Dandridge
A Lesson Before Dying
RKO 281
A Slight Case of Murder

New Media winners and nominees
Only nominees listed – winner unknown:

Best Home Entertainment Product/Kids & Family
The King and I Interactive Game
Pokémon Game
Toy Story 2 Game
Disney Princess Fashion Boutique
Walt Disney World Explorer

CD-ROM Game
Doom II: Hell on Earth
Duke Nukem: Time to Kill, Duke Nukem: Total Meltdown, and Duke Nukem 3D (For the Duke Nukem series.)
MechWarrior 3
Star Wars Jedi Knight: Dark Forces II
NBA Pro Basketball

CD-ROM Industry
Interact Media Solution
Final Draft
Quicken 2000
Final Cut Pro

Awards breakdown

Film
Winners:
5 / 7 Sleepy Hollow: Best Art Direction / Best Cinematography / Best Costume Design / Best Original Score / Best Sound
2 / 2 Toy Story 2: Best Animated or Mixed Media Film / Best Original Song
2 / 4 Being John Malkovich: Best Film – Musical or Comedy / Best Supporting Actress – Musical or Comedy
2 / 4 Boys Don't Cry: Best Actress – Drama / Best Supporting Actress – Drama
2 / 4 The Sixth Sense: Best Editing / Best Screenplay – Original
2 / 6 The Insider: Best Director / Best Film – Drama
1 / 1 Flawless: Best Actor – Musical or Comedy
1 / 1 The Limey: Best Actor – Drama
1 / 1 Three Seasons (Ba mua): Best Foreign Language Film
1 / 1 Tumbleweeds: Best Actress – Musical or Comedy
1 / 2 Happy, Texas: Best Supporting Actor – Musical or Comedy
1 / 2 Stuart Little: Best Visual Effects
1 / 3 All About My Mother (Todo sobre mi madre): Best Foreign Language Film
1 / 3 Buena Vista Social Club: Best Documentary Film
1 / 4 The Cider House Rules: Best Screenplay – Adapted
1 / 6 Magnolia: Outstanding Motion Picture Ensemble
1 / 6 Titus: Best Supporting Actor – Drama

Losers:
0 / 7 American Beauty
0 / 6 An Ideal Husband, The Talented Mr. Ripley
0 / 5 Snow Falling on Cedars
0 / 4 The Emperor and the Assassin (Jing ke ci qin wang)
0 / 3 Anna and the King, Eyes Wide Shut, Notting Hill, The Red Violin (Le violon rouge)
0 / 2 Dick, Dogma, Election, Felicia's Journey, The Legend of 1900 (La leggenda del pianista sull'oceano), A Map of the World, South Park: Bigger Longer & Uncut, Star Wars: Episode I – The Phantom Menace, The Straight Story, Sweet and Lowdown

Television
Winners:
3 / 3 Action: Best Actor & Actress – Musical or Comedy Series / Best Series – Musical or Comedy
2 / 2 The West Wing: Best Actor – Drama Series / Best Series – Drama
1 / 2 A Slight Case of Murder: Best Actor – Miniseries or TV Film
1 / 4 The Practice: Best Actress – Drama Series
1 / 1 The Color of Courage: Best Actress – Miniseries or TV Film
1 / 1 Hornblower: The Even Chance: Best Miniseries
1 / 3 Strange Justice: Best TV Film

Losers:
0 / 4 The Sopranos
0 / 3 Dharma & Greg, Frasier, Introducing Dorothy Dandridge
0 / 2 Becker, Joan of Arc, Law & Order, A Lesson Before Dying, Oz, P. T. Barnum

References

External links
2000 4th Annual SATELLITE™ Awards Nominees and Winners

Satellite Awards ceremonies
1999 awards
1999 film awards
1999 television awards